Margaret Maclay Bogardus (1804 – 1878) was an American miniature painter. 

Bogardus was Scottish by birth, the daughter of the  Reverend Archibald Maclay. Margaret Maclay emigrated to the United States in 1805, marrying James Bogardus in 1831. For a while after their marriage, Bogardus' paintings supported her husband, an inventor who would become known for his cast-iron buildings. In 1942 she became one of the first female members of the National Academy of Design, where she would exhibit until 1846. 

Her work is included in the collections of the Smithsonian American Art Museum, the Metropolitan Museum of Art, New York and the National Portrait Gallery, Washington.

She was interred with her husband at Green-Wood Cemetery in Brooklyn, New York.

References

1804 births
1878 deaths
19th-century American women artists
20th-century American women artists
Portrait miniaturists
19th-century American painters
20th-century American painters
Scottish emigrants to the United States
American women painters
National Academy of Design members
Burials at Green-Wood Cemetery